"The Girl That I Marry" is a song from the 1946 musical Annie Get Your Gun, written by Irving Berlin.

It was originally performed by Ray Middleton on stage and on record.

Hit versions in 1946 were by Frank Sinatra and by Eddy Howard (Majestic label).

Eddy Howard recorded a second rendition in the early 1950s on the Mercury label.

Later renditions include:
Per Grundén with orchestra Conductor: Hans Schreiber. Swedish lyrics written by Stig Bergendorff and Gösta Bernhard entitled "Den flickan skall bära mitt efternamn". Recorded in Stockholm on August 19, 1949, and released on the 78 rpm record His Master's Voice X 7540
 Howard Keel in the 1950 MGM film of Annie Get Your Gun, also released on record.
 John Raitt in a 1957 TV production with Mary Martin, recorded on Capitol Records.
 Bruce Yarnell in the 1966 production at Lincoln Centre, with Ethel Merman, recorded on RCA Records.
 Robert Goulet in the album Annie Get Your Gun (1963)
 Tom Wopat on the 1999 Broadway revival recording.

References

Songs from Annie Get Your Gun
Songs written by Irving Berlin
1946 songs
Eddy Howard songs
Frank Sinatra songs